Amanda Payton is an American actor. She is best known for playing Nina Rudolph on the NBC sitcom Trial & Error, Dr. Alison Parfit on the Sky Comedy/Peacock police comedy-drama Code 404, and Holly in the CBS sitcom United States of Al.

Early life
Payton was born in Santa Monica, California. She was educated at Los Angeles County High School for the Arts, and later attended Carnegie Mellon School of Drama, graduating with honors earning a Bachelor of Fine Arts.

Career
In 2008, Payton began her on-screen television career in an episode of the CBS crime drama Numbers. She has also starred in episodes of other television series including, Southland, CSI: Cyber, Game Shakers, The Big Bang Theory, Workaholics, Animal Kingdom, NCIS, Modern Family, Grey's Anatomy, and Young Sheldon. Payton had small roles in the feature films The Perfect Host and Beginners, both released in 2010.

In 2018, Payton joined the second season of the NBC sitcom Trial & Error, playing Nina Rudolph, a podcast host who moves to the series' fictional town of East Peck, South Carolina from New York to follow the trial of Lavinia Peck Foster (played by Kristin Chenoweth), and ends up in a love triangle with the characters, Josh and Carol.

In 2020, Payton joined the Sky Comedy British police procedural comedy-drama Code 404, playing American scientist Dr. Alison Parfit, who leads an artificial intelligence project to revive a killed Detective Inspector using AI. The third season of the series premiered on August 4, 2022.

In 2021, Payton had a recurring role in the sitcom United States of Al playing Holly, the girlfriend of former Marine combat veteran, Riley Dugan. Also in 2021, Payton played the protagonist, Sawyer, in the Lifetime Christmas film A Fiancé for Christmas, which premiered on December 9, 2021. From 2021 to 2022, Payton had a two-episode role on the NBC police action drama Chicago P.D., as Celeste Nichols, Officer Kevin Atwater girlfriend.

In January 2022, it was announced that Payton would star in the upcoming NBC drama Unbroken as Ella, a winemaker at a Californian ranch who tries to keep her family together since her mother's passing.

Filmography

Television

Film

References

External links
 

Living people
20th-century American actresses
21st-century American actresses
Actresses from Santa Monica, California
American television actresses
American web series actresses
Los Angeles County High School for the Arts alumni
Carnegie Mellon University College of Fine Arts alumni
Year of birth missing (living people)